Common Heart is a solo piano album by Richie Beirach. It was recorded in 1987 and released by Owl.

Recording and music
The album of solo piano performances by Beirach was recorded at Masonic Temple, New York City, on September 28–29, 1987. The material is a mix of Beirach originals and compositions by other jazz musicians.

Release and reception

Common Heart was released by Owl. The AllMusic reviewer described it as "Alternately stunning and uneven solo piano work". The Chicago Tribune reviewer wrote: "The solo piano is nice, but it never lifts, never cries out. Occasionally it seems to verge on a genuine sense of swing, then the dread seriousness comes back in to stifle it."

Track listing
"Liquid Silver"
"For B.C."
"Places"
"Nocturne No. 2 Vignettes"
"Foolish Door"
"Midpoint"
"Vadanna"
"The Last Rhapsody"
"Essence"

Personnel
Richie Beirach – piano

References

1987 albums
Richie Beirach albums
Solo piano jazz albums